Richard Rodriguez (born 1944) is an American writer.

Richard Rodriguez or Richard Rodríguez may also refer to:

 Ricky Rodriguez (1975–2005), ex-member of the Children of God religious movement
 Rich Rodriguez (born 1963), college football coach
 Rich Rodriguez (baseball) (born 1963), American baseball player
 Richard Rodriguez, Baruch College student leader and disciple of Andrew Salter
 Richard Rodríguez (cyclist) (born 1978), Chilean cyclist
 Richard Rodriguez (athlete) (born 1969), Aruban athlete
 Richard Rodríguez (baseball) (born 1990), Dominican baseball player
 Richard Rodríguez (footballer) (born 1992), Uruguay-born Nicaraguan footballer